The Brampton Centennial Secondary School shooting was a school shooting that occurred at Brampton Centennial Secondary School in Brampton, Ontario, Canada on Wednesday, May 28, 1975, at 11:35 a.m. The school closed for the remainder of the week following the shooting, and re-opened the following Monday.

Shooting
Michael Slobodian, a 16-year-old student at the school, had been cutting classes, and teacher Margaret Wright had called his parents to inform them of the issue. His mother confronted Slobodian about this during a mid-morning break, when Slobodian had gone home. Slobodian then wrote a note to his family, including "I am going to eliminate certain people from this world. Those people are: Mrs. Wright, Mr. Bronson and any other sucker who gets in my way. I am then going to kill myself so as not to be imprisoned." Ross Bronson was a physics teacher who had recently vetoed one of Slobodian's entries in a science fair. He wanted to get revenge because he hated the school system.

Slobodian returned to school with two rifles in a guitar case. He began by firing at three boys in a washroom, killing fellow student John Slinger and wounding the other two. He then entered the hallway and continued shooting, wounding several students. He proceeded to an art classroom, killed Wright and wounded two more students. He returned to the hallway and killed himself, adjacent to the art classroom. In addition to the three dead (including himself), Slobodian had wounded 13 others.

Witnesses of the shooting included students Cathy and Nancy Davis, the daughters of then Ontario Premier William Davis. Another witness of the shooting was Scott Thompson, of The Kids in the Hall fame, who was in the same English class with Slobodian that was taught by Wright.  Thompson has stated that the 24-year-old Wright, who was six months pregnant, had been his favourite teacher and the first person to encourage his writing talents.

See also
List of school-related attacks

References

External links
 "Revisiting A Canadian Tragedy", CBC Sunday

1975 in Ontario
1975 mass shootings in Canada
1975 murders in Canada
Deaths by firearm in Ontario
High school shootings
History of Brampton
Murder in Ontario
Murder–suicides in Canada
School shootings in Canada
Mass shootings in Canada
May 1975 events in Canada
School killings in Canada